The enzyme L-erythro-3-hydroxyaspartate aldolase catalyzes the chemical reaction

L-erythro-3-hydroxy-aspartate  glycine + glyoxylate

This enzyme belongs to the family of lyases, specifically the oxo-acid-lyases, which cleave carbon-carbon bonds.  The systematic name of this enzyme class is L-erythro-3-hydroxy-aspartate glyoxylate-lyase (glycine-forming). Other names in common use include erythro-beta-hydroxyaspartate aldolase, erythro-beta-hydroxyaspartate glycine-lyase, and erythro-3-hydroxy-Ls-aspartate glyoxylate-lyase.

References

 

EC 4.1.3
Enzymes of unknown structure